The 1960 United States presidential election in Utah took place on November 8, 1960, as part of the 1960 United States presidential election. State voters chose four representatives, or electors, to the Electoral College, who voted for president and vice president.

Utah was won by incumbent Vice President Richard Nixon (R–California), running with United States Ambassador to the United Nations Henry Cabot Lodge, Jr., with 54.81 percent of the popular vote, against Senator John F. Kennedy (D–Massachusetts), running with Senator Lyndon B. Johnson, with 45.17 percent of the popular vote.

Results

Results by county

See also
 United States presidential elections in Utah

References

Utah
1960
1960 Utah elections